The Institution of Textile Engineers and Technologists, simply known as ITET, is a Bangladeshi professional organisation of technical personnels with institutional qualifications in textiles education. It is the oldest and most influential of its kind in the country. It works as an umbrella for all textile engineers and technicians actively working in the textile industry of Bangladesh.

The organisation has its headquarters at Uttara sector in Dhaka City. It holds strong affiliation with the Textile Engineering Division of IEB. Department of Textiles of the government of the People's Republic of Bangladesh frequently takes advise and suggestions of this professionals' association to its consideration for the continuous growth of the industry.  it has its 14th Executive Committee operating within its 14th Council, the highest board of directors, responsible for the regulation of the institution.

References

Professional associations based in Bangladesh
Bangladeshi research organisations
Organisations based in Bangladesh
1983 establishments in Bangladesh
Organizations established in 1983